Paul Schneider (5 May 1927 – 16 April 2021) was a German artist and sculptor. He participated in the French-German artistic project Les Menhirs de l'Europe, primarily in Launstroff and Moselle.

Gallery

References

20th-century German sculptors
20th-century German male artists
21st-century German sculptors
German male sculptors
1927 births
2021 deaths
People from Saarbrücken